The Copa del Rey 1917 was the 17th staging of the Copa del Rey, the Spanish football cup competition.

The competition started on 11 March 1917, and concluded on 15 May 1917, with the final, held at the Camp de la Indústria in Barcelona, in which Madrid FC lifted the trophy for the 5th time ever with a 2–1 victory over Arenas Club de Getxo, thanks to a winner in extra-time from the 19-year-old Ricardo Álvarez.

Teams
 North Region: Arenas Club de Getxo
 Centre Region: Madrid FC
 South Region: Sevilla FC
Galicia: Real Vigo Sporting
Asturias: Sporting de Gijón
 Catalonia: FC Espanya de Barcelona

Quarterfinals
Real Vigo and España FC received a Bye to semifinals.

First leg

Second leg

Sevilla FC and Madrid CF won one match each. At that year, the Goal difference was not taken into account. A replay match was played.

Arenas Club de Getxo won 2–0 on aggregate matches.

Replay matchMadrid FC qualified to semifinals.Semifinals

First leg

Second legEspaña FC and Madrid FC won one match each. At that year, the Goal difference was not taken into account. A replay match was played.Arenas Club de Getxo won 4–2 on aggregate matches.''

Replay match

Second replay match

Final

Replay

References

Sources
LinguaSport.com
RSSSF.com

1917
1917 domestic association football cups
Copa